Don't Look Down is a 1998 American horror television film directed by Larry Shaw and produced by Wes Craven. It originally aired on 29 October 1998 on ABC. The film is about a woman who is struggling to cope with the death of her sister and joins a group for sufferers of acrophobia. However, it appears her problems may only be starting.

Production 

The film used locations in Vancouver and at the University of Northern British Columbia, Prince George in Canada.

Plot 

The film starts with Carla, her sister and her boyfriend on a road trip in the cliffs. After a freak accident when Carla's sister falls from a cliff, Carla develops a fear of heights. In an effort to overcome her phobia she joins a support group, but when the other members of the group begin dying one by one, Carla begins to suspect she was the real target of the accident.

Cast 

 Megan Ward as Carla Engel
 Billy Burke as Mark Engel
 Terry Kinney as Dr. Paul Sadowski

External links 

 
 

1998 television films
1998 films
1998 horror films
American horror television films
1990s English-language films
Films directed by Larry Shaw
1990s American films